Margaret Augusta Jennings, Baroness Florey (2 December 1904, Swanbourne – 14 November 1994), née Margaret Augusta Fremantle, was a British scientist who was part of the group at the University of Oxford under Howard Florey who worked on the clinical application of penicillin.

Education and career
Jennings studied PPE at Lady Margaret Hall, Oxford from 1924. She joined the University of Oxford's Sir William Dunn School of Pathology under Howard Florey in 1936.  By 1938, she was part of the team led by Florey investigating the production and applications of penicillin. Jennings undertook animal work as well as research on bacteriology. As part of testing, Jennings assayed the toxicity of penicillin extracts against white cells of the blood.

Personal life
Margaret married Denys Arthur Jennings in 1930, but the couple divorced in 1946. After 21 years, Jennings married Howard Florey, her long-time colleague and penicillin researcher, in 1967 after the death of his first wife Mary Ethel Florey.

References

 

1904 births
1994 deaths
Academics of the University of Oxford
British pathologists
Florey
English bacteriologists
People from Aylesbury Vale
Spouses of life peers
20th-century British women scientists
Alumni of Lady Margaret Hall, Oxford